East Yorkshire is an alternative name for the East Riding of Yorkshire, a county in Northern England.

East Yorkshire may also refer to:

East Yorkshire (bus company) – formerly East Yorkshire Motor Services – a bus company in Yorkshire, England
East Yorkshire (district), a local government district of the county of Humberside, England, from 1981 to 1996
East Yorkshire (UK Parliament constituency), created in 1997
East Riding of Yorkshire (UK Parliament constituency) (1832–1885)
East Riding, York Shire, one of three ridings of York Shire (Province of New York) (1664-1683), now Suffolk County, New York